Miguel Pedro Caetano Ramos (born 26 September 1971 in Porto) is a Portuguese racing driver. He is a former Spanish and Italian GT champion, and has raced in the FIA GT1 World Championship and the 24 Hours of Le Mans. In 2012 he races for V8 Racing, driving a Chevrolet Corvette C6.R in the International GT Open. In 2015 and 2016 he races for Teo Martín Motorsport in the International GT Open.

Early career
Ramos began his career in 1991, when he was only 18 years old, racing in the Autocross National Championship. During three years, he won several races and two national titles in Division II (2WD Touring Cars), in 1992 and in 1993, respectively.

In 1994 he switched to touring car racing and took part in the Troféu BMW M3/Mobil spec series, which at the time was the most powerful car in one-make series in Portugal. Ramos drove in the series for three years, finally taking the title in 1996 with six race wins. He then switched to the Portuguese Touring Car Championship in 1997, driving a BMW 320is with backing from the Portuguese BMW importer, taking third place overall. Winning one win in the final round of the series at the Ota Airport, he finished the championship in third position. He also took part in the Guia race of the Macau Grand Prix.

Career in Italy and Spain
In 1998, Ramos became the first Portuguese driver to take part in the Italian Superturismo Championship. With a lack of familiarity of the tracks and the competition, he ended the Privateer drivers classification in sixth position, with five podiums.

In 1999, at 27 years old, Ramos entered the Toyota Super Formula, his debut with single seater racing, his best result a third place in 2000. In 2001, Ramos moved up to the new Spanish Formula Three Championship, ending the season in 10th place overall.

The year of 2002 was of consecration! In the difficult but spectacular and competitive world of Grand Tourism cars, Miguel Ramos won the Spanish GT Championship with a Saleen, having as team colleague Pedro Chaves.
Also in the year 2002 he made his first participation in the 24 Hours of Le Mans. With the team Ray Mallock Ltd. team he achieved the 5th position on the GTS class.

The following seasons, in the years 2003 and 2004, was full of challenges. Having as adversaries some of the World's best drivers – some of them ex-Formula 1 drivers — Miguel Ramos participated in the prestigious and media-covered FIA GT Championship. Various impediments prevented well-deserved ascensions to the podium, but seven classifications in the first best ten positions, prove his unequivocal value.

Also in 2004 he participated on the Le Mans Endurance Series in a prototype with RML team driving a MG Lola prototype, getting for his team the 5th position on the championship.

2005 was and extremely competitive year for Miguel Ramos. The Italian GT Championship conflates the best of the Italian manufactures of GT, demonstrating a high level of the competitive pace. To traduce these, Miguel Ramos dispute until the last race the first position on the championship.
With the same Ferrari 550 Maranello, the Portuguese driver defended the National Flag on the Le Mans Series in the category of GT1, he participated at 4 of the 5 races achieving one first place in 1000km of Spa and two second places at Nürburgring and Istanbul.

In the 2006 season Miguel Ramos returned to the most competitive GT world championship, the FIA GT Championship, with the Aston Martin DBR9 in the GT1 class. The Portuguese driver achieved the 12th classification helping the team BMS Scuderia Italia to achieve the 2nd position in the GT1 Championship Teams. Also compete in a few races of the Italian GT Championship with the Maserati MC12 achieving two victories and one second place accumulating 38 points.

Racing record

Complete GT1 World Championship results

24 Hours of Le Mans results

References

External links
 Official website
 Ramos career statistics at Driver Database

1971 births
Living people
Portuguese racing drivers
FIA GT Championship drivers
24 Hours of Le Mans drivers
Euroformula Open Championship drivers
European Le Mans Series drivers
FIA GT1 World Championship drivers
International GT Open drivers
24 Hours of Spa drivers
Sportspeople from Porto
FIA Motorsport Games drivers
Aston Martin Racing drivers
Charouz Racing System drivers
Teo Martín Motorsport drivers
De Villota Motorsport drivers
Team Lazarus drivers
Target Racing drivers
AF Corse drivers
Lamborghini Squadra Corse drivers
24H Series drivers
Lamborghini Super Trofeo drivers
Mercedes-AMG Motorsport drivers